Malawi Washington Association  (MWA) was established in 1994 and is the first association in the United States that was organized to promote and retain Malawi and Malawian culture amongst Malawi's diaspora in the United States and Canada. It was founded by Peter Kapakasa, Stafford Chipungu, Jonathan Kamkwalala, and the late Henri Nsanjama. It is a non-political, non-ethnic organization that works to build community amongst the growing number of Malawians in the diaspora. It also works as a social support system to Malawians in the diaspora in order to instill  and promote the Malawian values of umunthu. It supports Malawians in the diaspora in various ways whom are living in the United States, including Malawian-Americans and Malawian citizens living in the U.S. It serves to create Malawian identity amongst Malawian-Americans and Malawians in the DC area. This includes hosting social events for a number of Malawians in the diaspora. It works with a number of organization in the DC area and abroad in order to promote Malawian culture and Malawian values  and to act as a resource of information on Malawi.  As the first organization for Malawians living in the diaspora in the United States, and one of the first organizations for the Malawian diaspora in the world, it has served as a blueprint for other Malawian organizations in the Malawian diaspora to organize in Indiana, Texas, New England and in England.It has also consulted with other Malawian organizations in starting up in the Malawian Diaspora.

Events
MWA has collaborated with Miss Africa International, the World Bank, Lions Club – Malawi, University of Malawi, the Embassy of Malawi, Zim-Expo and Friends of Malawi (returned peacecorps volunteers) through organizing various events, and fundraisers. MWA has held a number of cultural event in the Washington DC area that have helped to bring Malawian scholars, personalities and celebrities to the foreground. This includes events like "Sights and Sound of Malawi", "Malawi Nite" and the annual extravaganza weekend that coincides with both Malawian independence day (July 6) and U.S. Independence day (July 4). Past performances have featured Malawian musicians such as Wambali Mkandawire, and Masauko Chipembere. It has included theatrical performances by actor Gordon Timothy. It has also collaborated with diaspora organizations of neighboring countries like Zimbabwe, like Zim Expo in order to recognize the efforts of diaspora citizens that are contributing to their communities.

Panel discussions
MWA holds an annual form where items of importance to Malawi and the Malawian diaspora are discussed including healthcare in the United States, dual citizenship, gender rights, HIV/AIDS, legal advice and diaspora remittances. Past panel discussions have included representatives from the embassy of Malawi and actor, Michael Usi, and Charles Chuka.

Travel and sightseeing
MWA organizes trips for Malawians in order to help Malawians integrate into their new environments. This has included trips to surrounding states of NY, PA, VA, MD, and Washington D.C. It organizes visits to surrounding tourist attractions in such as museums and amusement parks.

Philanthropy and advocacy
MWA supports community and economic development in Malawi and encourages the diaspora to give back to Malawi. MWA participates in a number of philanthropic endeavors including supporting AIDS and Cancer charitable events both in the US and in Malawi. In the US MWA has participated in the Susan G Komen Breast Cancer Walk and the Whitman Aids Walk. In Malawi this includes raising money for Hunger Relief with the Lions Club. In 2005 MWA also assisted earthquake victims in the 2009 Karonga earthquakes. It has also raised over $20,500 for food relief in Malawi for the Malawi Feed the Nation Fund. MWA has raised funds to send Durable Medical Equipment to Malawi. It has also conducted Book drives for the University of Malawi, amongst other activities.

Advocacy
MWA works together with other non-profit groups in order to engage the government of Malawi for the realization of Dual Citizenship for Malawians in the Diaspora. MWA's initiative, Movement for Dual Citizenship for Malawi, aims at sensitizing Malawians about matters concerning dual citizenship in Malawi.

Notable guest speakers
Malawi Washington Association has organized events featuring Malawian and non-Malawian personalities from diverse political and ethnic backgrounds to speak at special events and MWA events. In 2004, it collaborated with the embassy of Malawi to organize an event for President Bingu wa Mutharika to address the Malawian Diaspora in Malawi. In 2012, MWA also participated in a Malawi embassy event where President Joyce Banda addressed the Malawian community. Other notable guests have included Malawian Minister of Tourism and Finance Ken Lipenga, radio personality Mwiza Munthali, actor Michael Usi, amongst others.

Organizational structure
MWA is a membership organization and receives all its funding from its members or community support. MWA has an elected Board of Trustees, Executive Board, and general membership.

Past presidents
Eddie Naming'ona, CPA (2008–present)
Viola Kamkwalala
Alexander Chanthunya, L.L.B
Elisa Munthali
 Felix Lindeire, CPA
Nelson Kanthula
Mwiza Munthali

Notable members (past and current) 
Charles Chuka (board member), Governor of Malawi Reserve Bank
Jane Kambalame(board member), High Commissioner to Zimbabwe and Botswana 
Anjimile Oponyo, (member)Principal Secretary of Education

See also
African immigration to the United States
Malawi Washington Association
Malawian Americans
Malawian diaspora
Malawi–United States relations

References

External links
MWA's Movement for Dual Citizenship for Malawi

1994 establishments in the United States
African culture in Maryland
Ethnic organizations based in the United States
Malawian American
Malawian culture
Organizations established in 1994
Southern African diaspora